James David Robenalt (born 1956) is a Cleveland-based lawyer for the firm Thompson Hine LLP. He is the author of four books: Linking Rings, William W. Durbin, the Magic and Mystery of America (2004), The Harding Affair: Love and Espionage During the Great War (2009), January 1973, Watergate, Roe v. Wade, Vietnam, and the Month that Changed America Forever (2015), and Ballots and Bullets: Black Power Politics and Urban Guerrilla Warfare in 1968 Cleveland (2018).

Early life and education

James (Jim) Robenalt was born in Lima, Ohio, in 1956. His mother was involved in education and local politics, while his father was a lawyer.  Robenalt attended Miami University where he majored in political science. During his time at MU he spent one semester in a study abroad program in Luxembourg. In 1978 he graduated magna cum laude and Phi Beta Kappa.  Robenalt, like his father before him, went to Ohio State University College of Law and graduated in 1981. At the time of his graduation he was Order of the Coif.

Law career

When Robenalt graduated from Ohio State in 1981 he took a job with Thompson, Hine and Flory. The firm is now known as Thompson Hine LLP. In 1989 he was made partner.  The Chambers USA Guide to America's Leading Business Lawyers named Robenalt as one of America's leading lawyers.  He focuses on legal issues related to construction, professional malpractice and tax.

Robenalt won large verdicts for several clients. He won an $81 million jury verdict for Avery Dennison, whom he began to represent in 1997, on an international espionage case.  The case drew international attention since it was the first prosecution under the Economic Espionage Act of 1996.

He also won a $68 million arbitration award for Atlanta-based Solvay Pharmaceuticals on a dispute about drug co-promotion agreements.|

Robenalt has also been a member of the Court of Nisi Prius, a Cleveland lawyers' humor society that produces an annual show of skits and songs lampooning the local, state, and national political scenes. Robenalt has been both a "Serjeant" and the "Judge" of that society, and plays guitar and sings in many of the shows.

Watergate CLE

Together with John W. Dean, President Richard Nixon's White House Counsel, Robenalt created a continuing education program on the national level called "The Watergate CLE."  This continuing legal education program, which was launched in Chicago in June 2011, has Robenalt teaching legal ethics and the representation of an organization under new Model Rules 1.13 and 1.6. John Dean plays the role of a fact witness while Watergate is used a case study.

Books

In June 2004 Robenalt, with the Kent State University Press, published Linking Rings, William W. Durbin, the Magic and Mystery of America.  The book is a biography of Robenalt's great-grandfather, W.W. Durbin, head of the Ohio Democratic Party during the era of William Jennings Bryan's campaign in 1896 until the second term of Franklin D. Roosevelt.

Robenalt published The Harding Affair: Love and Espionage During the Great War in 2009 under the Palgrave Macmillan Trade publishing company.  Robenalt wrote the book using bootleg microfilm copies of letters written by President Harding to his long-time mistress, Carrie Fulton Phillips. The thesis of the book is the possibility that Phillips may have been a German spy.

Robenalt's third book, January 1973, Watergate, Roe v. Wade, Vietnam, and the Month that Changed America Forever was published by the Chicago Review Press in May 2015.

Robenalt's fourth book, Ballots and Bullets: Black Power Politics and Urban Guerrilla Warfare in 1968 Cleveland was published by Lawrence Hill Books, an imprint of Chicago Review Press Incorporated in 2018.

Media

On July 26, 2014, Robenalt was interviewed on National Public Radio about Warren Harding's relationship with Carrie Fulton Phillips. During the interview NPR's Scott Simon discussed the love letters of Harding and Phillips, which were soon to be released for unhindered perusal by the public; and speculated about the possibility that Phillips was a German spy during World War I.

In July 2020, during the Trump administration and amid the COVID-19 pandemic, several months before the November presidential election, Robenalt argued that if Trump hadn't already left office and lost the election, Biden should promptly become president. He proposed a novel scenario for transfer of power (borrowing from President Woodrow Wilson's 1916 provisional resignation letter): “Trump would ask Pence to resign, appoint Biden as his VP, and then resign himself, allowing Biden to succeed to the presidency”.

References

1956 births
American lawyers
Ohio State University Moritz College of Law alumni
21st-century American historians
21st-century American male writers
Living people
American male non-fiction writers